The 1983 season of the Tongan A Grade was the 10th season of top flight association football competition in Tonga. Ngeleʻia FC won the championship for the second time, their second title in a then-record of 7 consecutive championships.

Teams 
 Fanga-'o-Pilolevu
 Halapili
 Halafuoleva
 Kolisi 'Atenisi
 Kolofoʻou
 Kolomotu'a
 Ma'ufanga
 Navutoka FC
 Ngeleʻia FC
 Tofoa FC
 Tonga High School
 'Utulau FC
 Veitongo FC

References 

Tonga Major League seasons
Tonga
Football